Kunkletown is an unincorporated community in Eldred Township, Monroe County, Pennsylvania, United States. It is located at an elevation of 531 feet. It is at ZIP Code 18058.

History
An 1845 book is the first published reference to Kunklesville. It says it bore "the name of its proprietor, [and that it] was started about 15 years ago, consisting of seven or eight dwellings, one tavern, one store, a school house, a German Reformed Church and a grist mill." A Stroudsburg, Pennsylvania newspaper referred to it as Kunkletown in December 1846.27.2 mile Tour of 47 Kunkletown Historic Locations

Demographics
The population of Kunkletown's ZIP code in the 2010 census was 9,464, of whom 8,924 were Caucasian, 377 were African-American, 499 were Hispanic, 81 were Asian, 77 were Indian, 9 were Hawaiian, and 161 were of other races. The average home value in 2000 was $114,800, and the average household income that year was $44,580.

Notable person
Gray Morrow, illustrator (lived there at time of death; born in Fort Wayne, Indiana)

References

External links

Unincorporated communities in Monroe County, Pennsylvania
Unincorporated communities in Pennsylvania